Del, or nabla, is an operator used in mathematics (particularly in vector calculus) as a vector differential operator, usually represented by the nabla symbol ∇. When applied to a function defined on a one-dimensional domain, it denotes the standard derivative of the function as defined in calculus. When applied to a field (a function defined on a multi-dimensional domain), it may denote any one of three operators depending on the way it is applied: the gradient or (locally) steepest slope of a scalar field (or sometimes of a vector field, as in the Navier–Stokes equations); the divergence of a vector field; or the curl (rotation) of a vector field.

Strictly speaking, del is not a specific operator, but rather a convenient mathematical notation for those three operators that makes many equations easier to write and remember.  The del symbol (or nabla) can be interpreted as a vector of partial derivative operators; and its three possible meanings—gradient, divergence, and curl—can be formally viewed as the product with a scalar, a dot product, and a cross product, respectively, of the "del operator" with the field. These formal products do not necessarily commute with other operators or products.  These three uses, detailed below, are summarized as:
 Gradient: 
 Divergence: 
 Curl:

Definition
In the Cartesian coordinate system  with coordinates  and standard basis , del is defined in terms of partial derivative operators as

Where the expression in parentheses is a row vector.  In three-dimensional Cartesian coordinate system  with coordinates  and standard basis or unit vectors of axes , del is written as

Example:

Del can also be expressed in other coordinate systems, see for example del in cylindrical and spherical coordinates.

Notational uses
Del is used as a shorthand form to simplify many long mathematical expressions. It is most commonly used to simplify expressions for the gradient, divergence, curl, directional derivative, and Laplacian.

Gradient
The vector derivative of a scalar field  is called the gradient, and it can be represented as:
 

In particular, if a hill is defined as a height function over a plane , the gradient at a given location will be a vector in the xy-plane (visualizable as an arrow on a map) pointing along the steepest direction. The magnitude of the gradient is the value of this steepest slope.

In particular, this notation is powerful because the gradient product rule looks very similar to the 1d-derivative case:
 

However, the rules for dot products do not turn out to be simple, as illustrated by:

Divergence
The divergence of a vector field
 is a scalar field that can be represented as:

The divergence is roughly a measure of a vector field's increase in the direction it points; but more accurately, it is a measure of that field's tendency to converge toward or diverge from a point.

The power of the del notation is shown by the following product rule:

The formula for the vector product is slightly less intuitive, because this product is not commutative:

Curl
The curl of a vector field  is a vector function that can be represented as:

The curl at a point is proportional to the on-axis torque that a tiny pinwheel would be subjected to if it were centred at that point.

The vector product operation can be visualized as a pseudo-determinant:

Again the power of the notation is shown by the product rule:

The rule for the vector product does not turn out to be simple:

Directional derivative
The directional derivative of a scalar field  in the direction
 is defined as:

In operator notation, the element in parentheses can be considered a single coherent unit; fluid dynamics uses this convention extensively, terming it the convective derivative—the "moving" derivative of the fluid.

Note that  is an operator that takes scalar to a scalar. It can be extended to operate on a vector, by separately operating on each of its components.

Laplacian
The Laplace operator is a scalar operator that can be applied to either vector or scalar fields; for cartesian coordinate systems it is defined as:
 
and the definition for more general coordinate systems is given in vector Laplacian.

The Laplacian is ubiquitous throughout modern mathematical physics, appearing for example in Laplace's equation, Poisson's equation, the heat equation, the wave equation, and the Schrödinger equation.

Hessian matrix

While  usually represents the Laplacian, sometimes  also represents the Hessian matrix.

 .

So whether  refers to a Laplacian or a Hessian matrix depends on the context.

Tensor derivative
Del can also be applied to a vector field with the result being a tensor. This quantity is equivalent to the transpose of the Jacobian matrix of the vector field with respect to space. The divergence of the vector field can then be expressed as the trace of this matrix.

For a small displacement , the change in the vector field is given by:

Product rules 

For vector calculus:

For matrix calculus (for which  can be written ):

Another relation of interest (see e.g. Euler equations) is the following, where  is the outer product tensor:

Second derivatives

When del operates on a scalar or vector, either a scalar or vector is returned. Because of the diversity of vector products (scalar, dot, cross) one application of del already gives rise to three major derivatives: the gradient (scalar product), divergence (dot product), and curl (cross product). Applying these three sorts of derivatives again to each other gives five possible second derivatives, for a scalar field f or a vector field v; the use of the scalar Laplacian and vector Laplacian gives two more:
 

These are of interest principally because they are not always unique or independent of each other.  As long as the functions are well-behaved ( in most cases), two of them are always zero:
 

Two of them are always equal:
 

The 3 remaining vector derivatives are related by the equation:

And one of them can even be expressed with the tensor product, if the functions are well-behaved:

Precautions

Most of the above vector properties (except for those that rely explicitly on del's differential properties—for example, the product rule) rely only on symbol rearrangement, and must necessarily hold if the del symbol is replaced by any other vector. This is part of the value to be gained in notationally representing this operator as a vector.

Though one can often replace del with a vector and obtain a vector identity, making those identities mnemonic, the reverse is not necessarily reliable, because del does not commute in general.

A counterexample that demonstrates the divergence and the advection operator are not commutative:

A counterexample that relies on del's differential properties:
 

Central to these distinctions is the fact that del is not simply a vector; it is a vector operator. Whereas a vector is an object with both a magnitude and direction, del has neither a magnitude nor a direction until it operates on a function.

For that reason, identities involving del must be derived with care, using both vector identities and differentiation identities such as the product rule.

See also
 Del in cylindrical and spherical coordinates
 Notation for differentiation
 Vector calculus identities
 Maxwell's equations
 Navier–Stokes equations
 Table of mathematical symbols
 Quabla operator

References
 Willard Gibbs & Edwin Bidwell Wilson (1901) Vector Analysis, Yale University Press, 1960: Dover Publications.

External links
A survey of the improper use of ∇ in vector analysis (1994) Tai, Chen

Vector calculus
Mathematical notation
Differential operators